Mbokassa is a village in Mbaïki district in the Lobaye region in the Central African Republic southwest of the capital, Bangui.

Nearby towns and villages include Peketo (1.5 nm), Pesselle (3.0 nm), Bossongo-Manoeuvres (3.3 nm), Seoundou (7.6 nm), Sakolongo (7.9 nm), Sebala (8.4 nm), Yaka (1.5 nm) and Boumbe (2.0 nm).

References

Populated places in Lobaye